Lichtenau may refer to:

In Germany:

 Towns and municipalities:
Hessisch Lichtenau
Lichtenau, Baden-Württemberg
Lichtenau, Bavaria
Lichtenau, Saxony
Lichtenau, Westphalia

Villages
Lichtenau, Lübbenau

Rivers
Lichtenau (river), Thuringia

In Austria:
 Towns and municipalities:
Lichtenau im Mühlkreis
Lichtenau im Waldviertel

In Greenland:
 Alluitsoq, a former settlement previously known as Lichtenau

In Czech Republic:
 Lichkov, German name Lichtenau, a village

In the United States:
 Lichtenau, Ohio, a ghost town

People with that name
Konrad of Lichtenau (died 1240), medieval German chronicler from Swabia
Heinrich von Lichtenau (1444–1517), Prince-Bishop of Augsburg
Wilhelmine, Gräfin von Lichtenau (1753–1820 in Berlin), official mistress of King Frederick William II of Prussia